Bulbophyllum corolliferum is a species of orchid in the genus Bulbophyllum native to Thailand, Borneo, Malaya, Sumatra.

References
The Bulbophyllum-Checklist
The Internet Orchid Species Photo Encyclopedia

External links

corolliferum